The following is a list of numbered minor planets in ascending numerical order. With the exception of comets, minor planets are all small bodies in the Solar System, including asteroids, distant objects and dwarf planets. The catalog consists of hundreds of pages, each containing 1,000 minor planets. Every year, the Minor Planet Center, which operates on behalf of the International Astronomical Union, publishes thousands of newly numbered minor planets in its Minor Planet Circulars (see index). , there are 619,150 numbered minor planets (secured discoveries) out of a total of 1,233,701 observed small Solar System bodies, with the remainder being unnumbered minor planets and comets.

The vast majority (97.3%) of minor planets are asteroids from the asteroid belt (the catalog uses a color code to indicate a body's dynamical classification). There are more than a thousand different minor-planet discoverers observing from a growing list of registered observatories. In terms of numbers, the most prolific discoverers are Spacewatch, LINEAR, MLS, NEAT and CSS.

It is expected that the upcoming survey by the Vera C. Rubin Observatory will discover another 5 million minor planets during the next ten years—almost a tenfold increase from current numbers. While all main-belt asteroids with a diameter above  have already been discovered, there might be as many as 10 trillion -sized asteroids or larger out to the orbit of Jupiter; and more than a trillion minor planets in the Kuiper belt. For minor planets grouped by a particular aspect or property, see .

Description of partial lists 

The list of minor planets consists of more than 600 partial lists, each containing 1000 minor planets grouped into 10 tables. The data is sourced from the Minor Planet Center (MPC) and expanded with data from the JPL SBDB (mean-diameter), Johnston's archive (sub-classification) and others (see detailed field descriptions below). For an overview of all existing partial lists, see .

The information given for a minor planet includes a permanent and provisional designation, a citation that links to the meanings of minor planet names (only if named), the discovery date, location, and credited discoverers ( and ), a category with a more refined classification than the principal grouping represented by the background color, a mean-diameter, sourced from JPL's SBDB or otherwise calculated estimates in italics, and a reference (Ref) to the corresponding pages at MPC and JPL SBDB.

The MPC may credit one or several astronomers, a survey or similar program, or even the observatory site with the discovery. In the first column of the table, an existing stand-alone article is linked in boldface, while (self-)redirects are never linked. Discoverers, discovery site and category are only linked if they differ from the preceding catalog entry.

Example 

|-bgcolor=#d6d6d6
| 189001 || 4889 P-L || — || 24 September 1960 || Palomar || PLS || — || align=right | 3.4 km || 
|-id=002 bgcolor=#fefefe
| 189002 || 6760 P-L || — || 24 September 1960 || Palomar || PLS || NYS || align=right data-sort-value="0.96" | 960 m || 
|-id=003 bgcolor=#d6d6d6
| 189003 || 3009 T-3 || — || 16 October 1977 || Palomar || PLS || — || align=right | 5.1 km || 
|-id=004 bgcolor=#C2FFFF
| 189004 Capys || 3184 T-3 ||  || 16 October 1977 || Palomar || PLS || L5 || align=right | 12 km || 
|-id=005 bgcolor=#E9E9E9
| 189005 || 5176 T-3 || — || 16 October 1977 || Palomar || PLS || — || align=right | 3.5 km || 
|}

The example above shows five catalog entries from one of the partial lists. All five asteroids were discovered at Palomar Observatory by the Palomar–Leiden survey (PLS). The MPC directly credits the survey's principal investigators, that is, the astronomers Cornelis van Houten, Ingrid van Houten-Groeneveld and Tom Gehrels. (This is the only instance where the list of minor planets diverges from the Discovery Circumstances in the official MPC list.) 189004 Capys, discovered on 16 October 1977, is the only named minor planet among these five. Its background color indicates that it is a Jupiter trojan (from the Trojan camp at Jupiter's ), estimated to be approximately 12 kilometers in diameter. All other objects are smaller asteroids from the inner (white), central (light-grey) and outer regions (dark grey) of the asteroid belt. The provisional designation for all objects is an uncommon survey designation.

Designation 

After discovery, minor planets generally receive a provisional designation, e.g. , then a leading sequential number in parenthesis, e.g. , turning it into a permanent designation (numbered minor planet). Optionally, a name can be given, replacing the provisional part of the designation, e.g. . (On Wikipedia, named minor planets also drop their parenthesis.)

In modern times, a minor planet receives a sequential number only after it has been observed several times over at least 4 oppositions. Minor planets whose orbits are not (yet) precisely known are known by their provisional designation. This rule was not necessarily followed in earlier times, and some bodies received a number but subsequently became lost minor planets. Only after a number is assigned is the minor planet eligible to receive a name. Usually the discoverer has up to 10 years to pick a name; many minor planets now remain unnamed. Especially towards the end of the twentieth century, large-scale automated asteroid discovery programs such as LINEAR have increased the pace of discoveries so much that the vast majority of minor planets will most likely never receive names.

For these reasons, the sequence of numbers only approximately matches the timeline of discovery. In extreme cases, such as lost minor planets, there may be a considerable mismatch: for instance the high-numbered  was originally discovered in 1937, but it was a lost until 2003. Only after it was rediscovered could its orbit be established and a number assigned.

Discoverers 

The MPC credits more than 1,000 professional and amateur astronomers as discoverers of minor planets. Many of them have discovered only a few minor planets or even just co-discovered a single one. Moreover, a discoverer does not need to be a human being. There are about 300 programs, surveys and observatories credited as discoverers. Among these, a small group of U.S. programs and surveys actually account for most of all discoveries made so far (see pie chart). As the total of numbered minor planets is growing by the tens of thousands every year, all statistical figures are constantly changing. In contrast to the Top 10 discoverers displayed in this articles, the MPC summarizes the total of discoveries somewhat differently, that is by a distinct group of discoverers. For example, bodies discovered in the Palomar–Leiden Survey are directly credited to the program's principal investigators.

Discovery site 

Observatories, telescopes and surveys that report astrometric observations of small Solar System bodies to the Minor Planet Center receive a numeric or alphanumeric MPC code such as 675 for the Palomar Observatory, or G96 for the Mount Lemmon Survey. On numbering, the MPC may directly credit such an observatory or program as the discoverer of an object, rather than one or several astronomers.

Category 

In this catalog, minor planets are classified into one of 8 principal orbital groups and highlighted with a distinct color. These are:

The vast majority of minor planets are evenly distributed between the inner-, central and outer parts of the asteroid belt, which are separated by the two Kirkwood gaps at 2.5 and 2.82 AU. Nearly 97.5% of all minor planets are main-belt asteroids (MBA), while Jupiter trojans, Mars-crossing and near-Earth asteroids each account for less than 1% of the overall population. Only a small number of distant minor planets, that is the centaurs and trans-Neptunian objects, have been numbered so far. In the partial lists, table column "category" further refines this principal grouping:
 main-belt asteroids show their family membership based on the synthetic hierarchical clustering method by Nesvorný (2014),
 resonant asteroids are displayed by their numerical ratio and include the Hildas (3:2), Cybeles (7:4), Thules (4:3) and Griquas (2:1), while the Jupiter trojans (1:1) display whether they belong to the Greek or Trojan camp,
 Hungaria asteroids (H), are labelled in italics (H), when they are not members of the collisional family
 near-Earth objects are divided into the Aten (ATE), Amor (AMO), Apollo (APO), and Atira (ATI) group, with some of them being potentially hazardous asteroids (PHA), and/or larger than one kilometer in diameter (+1km) as determined by the MPC.
 trans-Neptunian objects are divided into dynamical subgroups including cubewanos (hot or cold), scattered disc objects, plutinos and other Neptunian resonances,
 comet-like and/or retrograde objects with a TJupiter value below 2 are tagged with damocloid,
 other unusual objects based on MPC's and Johnston's lists are labelled unusual,
 binary and trinary minor planets with companions are tagged with "moon" and link to their corresponding entry in minor-planet moon,
 objects with an exceptionally long or short rotation period are tagged with "slow" (period of 100+ hours) or "fast" (period of less than 2.2 hours) and link to their corresponding entry in List of slow rotators and List of fast rotators, respectively.
 minor planets which also received a periodic-comet number (such as ) link to the List of numbered comets

 (a) NEO-subgroups with number of members: Aten (255), Amor (1,275), Apollo (1,566) and Atira (8) asteroids.
 (b) Including 35 unclassified bodies: .
 (c) This chart has been created using a classification scheme adopted from and with data provided by the JPL Small-Body Database.

Diameter 

If available, a minor planet's mean diameter in meters (m) or kilometers (km) is taken from the NEOWISE mission of NASA's Wide-field Infrared Survey Explorer, which the Small-Body Database has also adopted. Mean diameters are rounded to two significant figures if smaller than 100 kilometers. Estimates are in italics and calculated from a magnitude-to-diameter conversion, using an assumed albedo derived from the body's orbital parameters or, if available, from a family-specific mean albedo (also see asteroid family table).

Main index 

This is an overview of all existing partial lists of numbered minor planets (LoMP). Each table stands for 100,000 minor planets, each cell for a specific partial list of 1,000 sequentially numbered bodies. The data is sourced from the Minor Planet Center. For an introduction, see .

Numberings 1–100,000

Numberings 100,001–200,000

Numberings 200,001–300,000

Numberings 300,001–400,000

Numberings 400,001–500,000

Numberings 500,001–600,000

Numberings 600,001–700,000

Specific lists 

The following are lists of minor planets by physical properties, orbital properties, or discovery circumstances:
 List of exceptional asteroids (physical properties)
 List of slow rotators (minor planets)
 List of fast rotators (minor planets)
 List of tumblers (small Solar System bodies)
 List of instrument-resolved minor planets
 List of Jupiter trojans (Greek camp)
 List of Jupiter trojans (Trojan camp)
 List of minor planets visited by spacecraft 
 List of minor planet moons
 List of minor-planet groups
 List of named minor planets (alphabetical)
 List of named minor planets (numerical)
 List of possible dwarf planets
 List of centaurs (small Solar System bodies)
 List of trans-Neptunian objects
 List of unnumbered minor planets
 List of unnumbered trans-Neptunian objects
 Meanings of minor planet names
 List of minor planets named after people
 List of minor planets named after places
 List of minor planets named after rivers
 List of minor planets named after animals and plants

See also 
 Lists of astronomical objects
 Binary asteroid
 Dwarf planets 
 Kuiper belt (A major ring of bodies in the Solar System, around 30-60 AU and home to Pluto)
 Minor-planet moon
 Trans-Neptunian object

Other lists 
 List of comets

Notes

References

Further reading 
 Dictionary of Minor Planet Names, 5th ed.: Prepared on Behalf of Commission 20 Under the Auspices of the International Astronomical Union, Lutz D. Schmadel, 
 The Names of the Minor Planets, Paul Herget, 1968,

External links 
 How Many Solar System Bodies, Jet Propulsion Laboratory Small-Body Database
 SBN Small Bodies Data Archive
 JPL Minor Planet Database for physical and orbital data (of any Small Solar System Body or dwarf planet)
  
 Minor Planet Center
 Lists and plots: Minor Planets
 MPC Discovery Circumstances (minor planets by number)
 CNEOS, Center for Near-Earth Object Studies, NASA
 PDS Asteroid Data Archive
  
  
  

Lists of small Solar System bodies